Pritchett is a Statutory Town in Baca County, Colorado, United States. The population was 140 at the 2010 census.

A post office called Pritchett has been in operation since 1927.  The community was named after Henry S. Pritchett, a railroad official.

Geography
Pritchett is located in western Baca County at  (37.369081, -102.860122). U.S. Route 160 passes through the town, leading east  to Springfield, the county seat, and west  to Trinidad.

Demographics

As of the census of 2000, there were 137 people, 58 households, and 40 families residing in the town. The racial makeup of the town was 97.08% White, 2.19% Native American, and 0.73% from two or more races. Hispanic or Latino of any race were 1.46% of the population.

There were 58 households, out of which 36.2% had children under the age of 18 living with them, 53.4% were married couples living together, 12.1% had a female householder with no husband present, and 31.0% were non-families. 27.6% of all households were made up of individuals, and 19.0% had someone living alone who was 65 years of age or older. The average household size was 2.36 and the average family size was 2.93.

In the town, the population was spread out, with 28.5% under the age of 18, 4.4% from 18 to 24, 27.0% from 25 to 44, 19.7% from 45 to 64, and 20.4% who were 65 years of age or older. The median age was 39 years. For every 100 females, there were 95.7 males. For every 100 females age 18 and over, there were 88.5 males.

The median income for a household in the town was $19,750, and the median income for a family was $25,625. Males had a median income of $17,917 versus $15,625 for females. The per capita income for the town was $10,876. There were 9.1% of families and 14.6% of the population living below the poverty line, including 16.0% of under eighteens and 3.2% of those over 64.

Popular culture
The film The Hi-Lo Country, a 1998 drama/western film directed by Stephen Frears, starring Billy Crudup, Woody Harrelson, Cole Hauser, Sam Elliott, Patricia Arquette, Penélope Cruz and Enrique Castillo, was filmed in part in the town of Pritchett.

See also

Outline of Colorado
Index of Colorado-related articles
State of Colorado
Colorado cities and towns
Colorado municipalities
Colorado counties
Baca County, Colorado

References

External links

CDOT map of the Town of Pritchett

Towns in Baca County, Colorado
Towns in Colorado